Natavadi is a region in the Indian state of Andhra Pradesh. It comprises, parts of Vijayawada and Nandigama mandals in Krishna district and Madhira of Khammam district.

References 

Sub regions of Andhra Pradesh
Coastal Andhra
Geography of Krishna district
Khammam district